Chamizal National Memorial, located in El Paso, Texas, along the United States–Mexico international border, is a National Park Service site commemorating the peaceful settlement of the Chamizal boundary dispute.

Facility
The  memorial park serves primarily as a cultural center and contains art galleries, a theater, and an amphitheatre.  A museum, which details the history of the U.S.–Mexico border, is located inside the visitor center.  The park honors the peaceful resolution of the Chamizal dispute, a more than 100-year border dispute between the United States and Mexico that resulted from the natural change of course of the Rio Grande between the cities of El Paso and Ciudad Juárez, Chihuahua.  This national memorial was established on part of the disputed land that was assigned to the United States according to the Chamizal Convention of 1963; a corresponding  was created on the now-Mexican portion of the land.
The Chamizal Convention was negotiated by the International Boundary and Water Commission, which was established in 1889 to maintain the border, and pursuant to later treaties to allocate river waters between the two nations, and provide for flood control and water sanitation.

Administrative history
The National Memorial was authorized on June 30, 1966.  It was established as a National Park Service unit on February 4, 1974, and was administratively listed on the National Register of Historic Places the same day.

Admission and hours
Fees and permits required to use the theater. Fees for picnic facilities for groups of 50 or more.

Park grounds, 5 a.m. - 10 p.m. daily.  Closed Thanksgiving, Christmas and New Year's Day.

Visitors center and galleries open 10 a.m. - 5 p.m . Administration office open 8 a.m. - 4:30 p.m.

See also

National Register of Historic Places listings in El Paso County, Texas
List of national memorials of the United States

References

External links

 Official NPS website: Chamizal National Memorial
 NPS image archive
Footage of the Chamizal National Memorial from Tapestry (1974) on the Texas Archive of the Moving Image

Geography of El Paso, Texas
History museums in Texas
Monuments and memorials in Texas
Mexico–United States border
Museums in El Paso, Texas
National Memorials of the United States
National Register of Historic Places in El Paso County, Texas
Peace parks
Protected areas established in 1974
Protected areas of El Paso County, Texas
National Park Service areas in Texas
1974 establishments in Texas
Monuments and memorials on the National Register of Historic Places in Texas